Biltmore Estate Office is a historic office building located at Biltmore Village, Asheville, Buncombe County, North Carolina.  It was designed by architect Richard Morris Hunt and built in 1896.  It is a 1 1/2-story pebbledash finished building with a hipped roof, half-timbering, brick trim, and chamfered and bracketed porch posts.

It was listed on the National Register of Historic Places in 1979.

References

Office buildings on the National Register of Historic Places in North Carolina
Buildings and structures completed in 1896
Buildings and structures in Asheville, North Carolina
National Register of Historic Places in Buncombe County, North Carolina